The Pasifika Times was an Auckland-based newspaper circulated in Niue, Tonga, and Auckland. It partnered with Niue Economic Review in 2000.

The newspaper ceased publishing in 2002, and editor Peter Moala said the group would continue publishing the Taimi'O Tonga, the Cook Island Star and the Samoa Independent newspapers.

References
Niue News Update for 2002-03-25

Newspapers published in New Zealand
Mass media in Auckland
Mass media in Niue
Mass media in Tonga
2002 disestablishments in New Zealand
Publications disestablished in 2002